Robson Azevedo da Silva (born 21 July 1995 in São Caetano do Sul), commonly known as Robinho, is a Brazilian professional footballer who plays as a winger. He currently plays in the Bangladesh Premier League for Bashundhara Kings as a vice-captain.

Club career

Early career
Born in São Caetano do Sul, São Paulo, Robinho was a Mirassol youth graduate, but made his senior debut with Atibaia in 2016. Later in that year, he was loaned to Série C side Confiança, but did not play in any match for the club.

After scoring seven goals for Atibaia in the 2017 Campeonato Paulista Série A3, Robinho was loaned to Figueirense in the Série B. He immediately became a starter for his new side, scoring seven times in only 18 appearances.

Fluminense
On 13 August 2017, Fluminense announced the signing of Robinho from Atibaia on a four-year contract, for a rumoured fee of € 2 million (R$ 7.4 million) for 50% of the economic rights. He made his Série A debut on 10 September, replacing Douglas Augusto in a 2–2 away draw against Vitória.

Loans to América Mineiro, CSA and Vila Nova
After failing to establish himself at Flu, Robinho was loaned to América Mineiro in 2018. After only 12 goalless matches, he joined CSA on loan until the end of the year on 25 February 2019.

After just nine matches at CSA, Robinho's loan was cut short and he moved to Vila Nova, also in a temporary deal.

Bashundhara Kings 
On 5 August 2020, Robinho moved abroad for the first time in his career and joined Bangladeshi club Bashundhara Kings on a season-long loan. On 22 December, he scored his first goal with Kings in  the 2020–21 Bangladesh Federation Cup. Robinho scored 24 goals for the Kings during his loan period, lifting a domestic double with the club and being the league's top goalscorer with 21 goals.

Following the season, his contract with Fluminense expired and he signed a permanent deal with Bashundhara.

Robinho scored the first-ever goal at the new Bashundhara Kings Arena Stadium on 17 February 2022, during a 3–0 win against Bangladesh Police FC.

On 17 July 2022 he extended his contract with Kings until 2024.

Career statistics

Club

Honours
CSA
 Campeonato Alagoano: 2019

Bashundhara Kings
Bangladesh Premier League: 2020–21
Bangladesh Federation Cup: 2020–21

References

External links

1995 births
Living people
People from São Caetano do Sul
Brazilian footballers
Association football forwards
Campeonato Brasileiro Série A players
Campeonato Brasileiro Série B players
Mirassol Futebol Clube players
Sport Club Atibaia players
Associação Desportiva Confiança players
Figueirense FC players
Fluminense FC players
América Futebol Clube (MG) players
Centro Sportivo Alagoano players
Vila Nova Futebol Clube players
Bangladesh Premier League players
Bashundhara Kings players
Brazilian expatriate footballers
Brazilian expatriate sportspeople in Bangladesh
Expatriate footballers in Bangladesh
Footballers from São Paulo (state)
Bangladesh Football Premier League players